Fool Circle is a 2014 French comedy-drama film directed by Vincent Mariette and starring Ludivine Sagnier, Laurent Lafitte and Vincent Macaigne.

Cast 
 Ludivine Sagnier as Chloé
 Laurent Lafitte as Léon Camus
 Vincent Macaigne as Bruno Camus
 Noémie Lvovsky as Rebecca
 Philippe Rebbot as Yvan
 Dominique Reymond as Claude
  as Florence
 Délia Espinat-Dief as Lola  
 Emile Baujard as Jérôme Camus
 Théo Cholbi as Guillaume

References

External links 
 

2014 films
2010s French-language films
Tragicomedy films
French road comedy-drama films
2010s road comedy-drama films
Films scored by Robin Coudert
2014 directorial debut films
2010s French films